Manuel Montt  is an underground metro station on the Line 1 of the Santiago Metro, in Santiago, Chile. It was opened on 22 August 1980 as part of the metro extension from Salvador to Escuela Militar. Initially its walls were covered with stoneware ceramic tiles of blue and orange colors, some of which loosen or fall off as a consequence of the 2010 Chile earthquake. The total replacement of its wall tiles is underway.

References

Santiago Metro stations
Railway stations opened in 1980
1980 establishments in Chile
Santiago Metro Line 1